The Czech Republic national rugby sevens team is a minor national sevens side.

History
Their most notable achievement to date was in 2001, when they won the Bowl final of the Sri Lanka Sevens.

Sri Lanka Sevens
{| class="wikitable"
|-
!width=40|Year
!width=165|Cup
!width=165|Plate
!width=165|Bowl
|-
|1999||||||
|-
|2000|||||| 
|-
|2001||||||
|-
|2002||||||
|-
|2003||||||
|-
|2004||||||
|-
|2005||||||
|-
|2006||||||
|-
|2007||||||
|-
|2008||||||
|}

European Championship
The Czechs made their first European Championship appearance at Heidelberg in 2002, where they finished 11th out of a possible 12. In 2003, when the final tournament was again at Heidelberg, they finished 10th. The following year saw the tournament, which also doubled as qualifiers for the 2005 Rugby World Cup Sevens, at Palma de Majorca in Spain, with the team claiming the Shield after beating Poland 17-5. They haven't qualified for the Championship again since that particular tournament.

European Championship results

Results

2008

2009

 Czech wins in bold.

Current players
Squad for 2008 Zagreb Sevens:
Ota Hejmala (Zlín)
Jan Rudolf (Petrovice)
Jakub Procházka (Tatra Smíchov)
Jan Frýdl (Tatra Smíchov)
Václav Jursík (Sparta Prague)
Michal Schlanger (Petrovice)
Jan Konečný (Bystrc)
Petr Okleštěk (Auxerre, France)
Michal Ouředník (Sparta Prague/ARC Iuridica)
Antonín Brabec (Tatra Smíchov) (player-coach)

Notes and references

Rugby union in the Czech Republic
Czech Republic national rugby union team
National rugby sevens teams